Worodougou Region is one of the 31 regions of Ivory Coast and is currently one of three regions of Woroba District. The region's seat is Séguéla. The region's population in the 2021 census was 429,812.

Departments
Worodougou is currently divided into two departments: Kani and Séguéla.

History

Worodougou Region was established in 1997 as a first-level administrative subdivision. At its establishment, it included all of the territory that is today Woroba District. In 2000, Bafing Region was created by dividing Worodougou.

Worodougou retained its new boundaries until the 2011 reorganisation of the subdivisions of Ivory Coast, when it was divided a second time, the latter to create Béré Region. As part of the reorganisation, Worodougou was converted into a second-level subdivision and with Bafing and Béré became part of the first-level Woroba District.

Notes

 
Regions of Woroba District
1997 establishments in Ivory Coast
States and territories established in 1997